The Nord Aviation N 500 Cadet was a single-seat VTOL research aircraft built by Nord Aviation in 1967.

Design and development
A model kit presenting the concept was first shown at the Paris Air Show at Le Bourget in 1965. The aircraft was driven by two ducted fans, with three blades per fan, mounted on short wings that were able to pivot between providing vertical and horizontal thrust.

Two prototypes were constructed, one making its first (tethered) flight in July 1968.

Specifications (N500)

See also

References

 
 Aviafrance

N 500 Cadet
1960s French experimental aircraft
Tilting ducted fan aircraft
Single-engined twin-prop tractor aircraft
High-wing aircraft
Aircraft first flown in 1967